Dimethylurea (DMU) (IUPAC systematic name: 1,3-Dimethylurea ) is a urea derivative and used as an intermediate in organic synthesis. It is a colorless crystalline powder with little toxicity.

Uses
1,3-Dimethylurea is used for synthesis of caffeine, theophylline, pharmachemicals, textile aids, herbicides and others.
In the textile processing industry 1,3-dimethylurea is used as intermediate for the production of formaldehyde-free easy-care finishing agents for textiles.
The estimated world production of DMU is estimated to be less than 25,000 tons.

References

Ureas